Midwestern Baptist College,  is an independent Baptist college in Orion, Michigan.

History
It specializes in Christian theological doctrine. Malone wanted to offer a faith-based education including both academics and morals. The college also stressed being a moral compass, to "abstain from all appearances of evil", and fulfilling the Great Commission.

For the fall semester of 2010, Midwestern planned to move from Pontiac, Michigan to the property of Shalom Baptist Church in Orion Township, Michigan.

Education

Midwestern Baptist College is not accredited by any accreditation body recognized by its country. According to the US Department of Education, unaccredited degrees and credits might not be acceptable to employers or other institutions, and use of degree titles may be restricted or illegal in some jurisdictions. Some of the school's courses are accepted for transfer credit at nearby Oakland Community College.

The highest degree the college awards is the Bachelor of Religious Education (B.R.E.) or Bachelor of Sacred Music (B.S.M.). The school also offers associate degree in Music, Commercial Subjects, and Biblical Studies.

Alumni
Chuck Baldwin, attended for two years, but did not graduate. Baldwin was the presidential nominee of the Constitution Party for the 2008 U.S. Presidential election.
Kent Hovind, an evangelist, young-earth creationist, and convicted tax protestor, earned a Bachelor of Religious Education in 1974.
Gary Click, a politician.

See also
 List of unaccredited institutions of higher learning
 School accreditation

References

External links 
 Midwestern Baptist College – Official website

Unaccredited Christian universities and colleges in the United States
Baptist Christianity in Michigan
Educational institutions established in 1953
Seminaries and theological colleges in Michigan
Universities and colleges in Oakland County, Michigan
1953 establishments in Michigan
Independent Baptist universities and colleges in the United States